The Worldwide Independent Network/Gallup International Association (WIN/GIA) was an international cooperation of independent market research and polling firms. The group was created in May 2010 when the Gallup International Association (GIA), created in 1947, and the Worldwide Independent Network of market research (WIN), created in April 2007, started their cooperation. The cooperation ended in 2017.

References

Organizations established in 2010
Public opinion research companies
Organisations based in Zürich
Organizations disestablished in 2017